is a railway station in the city of Ichinomiya, Aichi Prefecture, Japan, operated by Meitetsu.

Lines
Iwato Station is served by the Meitetsu Nagoya Main Line and is 93.9 kilometers from the terminus of the line at Toyohashi Station.

Station layout
The station has two opposed side platforms on an embankment connected to the station building by a footbridge and to each other by an underground passage. The station has automated ticket machines, Manaca automated turnstiles and is unattended.

Platforms

Adjacent stations

Station history
Kisogawa-zutsumi Station was opened on March 1, 1939.

Passenger statistics
In fiscal 2013, the station was used by an average of 691 passengers daily.

Surrounding area
 Kiso River

See also
 List of Railway Stations in Japan

References

External links

 Official web page 

Railway stations in Japan opened in 1939
Railway stations in Aichi Prefecture
Stations of Nagoya Railroad
Ichinomiya, Aichi